Pierre-Georges Castex (20 June 1915 at Toulouse – 9 December 1995 at Paris) was a French academic, literary critic and author.

Professor of Modern French Literature at Paris-Sorbonne University from 1956 until 1982, Castex was distinguished by election as a Member of the Académie des Sciences Morales et Politiques in 1974.

References

External links 
 www.librairiedialogues.fr
 Pierre-Georges Castex Prize (founded 2000)

1915 births
1995 deaths
Writers from Toulouse
French biographers
French educators
French literary historians
Historians of French literature
Paris-Sorbonne University
Academic staff of the University of Paris
Members of the Académie des sciences morales et politiques
20th-century biographers
20th-century French male writers
French male non-fiction writers